BMX Bandits may refer to:

 BMX Bandits (band), a Glaswegian guitar pop band
 BMX Bandits (film), a 1983 Australian children's movie featuring Nicole Kidman
 "BMX Bandits", a 2005 song from Wheatus' album TooSoonMonsoon which alludes to the film